The Geography of Bliss: One Grump's Search for the Happiest Places in the World is the New York Times-bestselling humorous travel memoir by longtime National Public Radio foreign correspondent Eric Weiner. In the book, Weiner travels to spots around the globe—including Iceland, Bhutan, Moldova and Qatar—to search out how different countries define and pursue happiness. Weiner is also the author of Man Seeks God: My Flirtations with the Divine.

According to Kirkus Reviews, the book is "Part travelogue, part personal-discovery memoir....reads like Paul Theroux channeling David Sedaris on a particularly good day."

References

External links
 EricWeinerBooks.com
 Q and A with Eric Weiner about the book

Media Appearances
Interview on The Diane Rehm Show
piece on the book on NPR Weekend Edition
Colbert Report interview
Nightline interview

2008 non-fiction books
American travel books
Twelve (publisher) books